Erycitidae is a family of Lower and Middle Jurassic ammonites included in the Hildoceratoidea.  The hammatoceratid subfamily Erycitinae is equivalent.  Genera include Erycites (type) and Abbasites.

Description
Erycitids are generally evolute with all whorls showing and are strongly ribbed with ribs branching on the outer part of the flanks and crossing over the outer rim, or venter.

Classification
In older taxonomies, e.g. W.J. Arkell et al., 1964 and D.T. Donovan et al., 1981, the Hammatoceratidae, which then included erycitid genera, was part of the Hammatoceratoidea. More recently the Erycitidae was reassigned to the Hammatoceratoidea which also includes the Hammatoceratidae, Graphoceratidae and Sonniniidae removed from the Hildoceratoidea, left with only the Hildoceratidae and its included subfamilies.

References

 W.J. Arkell et al., 1957. Treatise on Invertebrate Paleontology Part L. Curt Tychert & R.C Moore (eds)
 D.T. Donovan et al., 1981. Classification of the Jurassic Ammonitina. The Ammonoidea. Systematics Association Special Volume no 18.  
 subfamily Erycitinae Spath 1928

Hildoceratoidea
Ammonitida families
Jurassic ammonites
Early Jurassic first appearances
Middle Jurassic extinctions